The Women's Lightweight Weightlifting Event (58 kg) is the third women's weight class event at the weightlifting competition, limited to competitors with a maximum of 58 kilograms of body mass. The competition at the 1999 World Weightlifting Championships took place in Athens, Greece on 22 November 1999.

Each lifter performed in both the snatch and clean and jerk lifts, with the final score being the sum of the lifter's best result in each. The athlete received three attempts in each of the two lifts; the score for the lift was the heaviest weight successfully lifted.

Medalists

Records

Results

New records

References
Weightlifting World Championships Seniors Statistics, Page 20

External links
Weightlifting Databank

- Women's 58 kg, 1999 World Weightlifting Championships
World